Grafenort railway station is a Swiss railway station in the municipality of Engelberg in the canton of Obwalden. It is on the Luzern–Stans–Engelberg line, which is owned by the Zentralbahn railway company. It takes its name from the nearby settlement of Grafenort.

Services 
The following services stop at Grafenort:

References

External links 
 

Railway stations in the canton of Obwalden
Engelberg
Zentralbahn stations